Romance is an unincorporated community in Jackson County, West Virginia, United States. It formerly had a post office with a zip code of 25175, but this closed on February 18, 1986. The area between Middle Fork and Advent is also considered Romance.

The community was named after Romance Parsons, an early settler.

References

Unincorporated communities in West Virginia
Unincorporated communities in Jackson County, West Virginia